Oleg Mikhailov (born 6 January 1987, Pechora, Komi Republic) is a Russian political figure and a deputy of the 8th State Duma.
 
In 2007, Mikhailov joined the Communist Party of the Russian Federation. In 2011, he was elected deputy of the Council of the municipality of the Syktyvkar municipal district. In 2012, he started working at the Institute of Biology, Komi Scientific Center, Ural Branch of the Russian Academy of Sciences. From 2020 to 2021, he was the deputy of the State Council of the Komi Republic of the 7th convocation. Since September 2021, he has served as deputy of the 8th State Duma.

References
 

 

1973 births
Living people
Communist Party of the Russian Federation members
21st-century Russian politicians
Eighth convocation members of the State Duma (Russian Federation)
People from Pechora